Preoptic nucleus can refer to:
 Median preoptic nucleus
 Ventrolateral preoptic nucleus
 Anterodorsal preoptic nucleus
 Preoptic area